An entity is something that exists as itself.

Entity may also refer to:

Arts and entertainment

Film and television
 Entity (2012 film), a British supernatural thriller
 Entity (2014 film), an English-language French sci-fi horror short
 "Entity" (Stargate SG-1), a 2001 American sci-fi television episode

Music
 Entities (album), a 2007 album by Malefice
 Entity (album), a 2011 album by Origin
 Entity (netlabel), a Belgian label specialising in experimental electronic music

Other uses in arts and entertainment
 "Entity" (short story), a 1949 science fiction story
 Entity FX, a visual effects company
 Life Entity, a fictional creature in DC comics

Specific uses of entity

In the humanities
 Legal entity, a body holding rights and obligations
 Non-physical entity, in philosophy
 Spirit (vital essence), in folklore and religion
 Political entity (or polity), in geopolitics and society

In computing
 Entity (computer science), a user-relevant virtual object with an identity independent of change to its attributes
 Entities (or the entity class) in the entity–relationship model, a conceptual model for data which can be used to design and create relational databases
 Enhanced entity–relationship model or extended entity–relationship model, a high-level or conceptual data model for design of databases incorporating extensions to the original entity–relationship model
 Entity-control-boundary, entity-boundary-control or boundary-control-entity, an architectural pattern used in use-case driven object-oriented software design that structures the classes composing a software according to their responsibilities in the use-case realization
 Character entity reference, an XML/HTML escape code for a single typographical character
 SGML entity, a primitive data type in Standard Generalized Markup Language

See also
 The Entity (disambiguation)
 
 Entitativity, in social sciences 
 Entity concept, the accounting principle
 Entity Framework, an open-source, .Net object mapping system
 Entity Registry, a Norwegian database of legal entities